Lani Mercado-Revilla (born Jesusa Victoria Garcia Hernandez; April 13, 1968) is a Filipino actress and politician serving as representative of Cavite's 2nd district, which comprises only the city of Bacoor, from 2010 to 2016.

Personal life
She married actor and incumbent Senator Bong Revilla, in a civil wedding in 1986. They have seven children, namely:
 Leonard Bryan Bautista (born in November 1986)
 Jose Lorenzo Bautista III (Ramon "Jolo" Revilla III, born in March 1988), Representative of Cavite's 1st congressional district and Vice Governor of Cavite, married to Angelica Alita
 Inah Felicia Bautista-Del Rosario (born in October 1989) married to Vince del Rosario
 Maria Alexandra Bautista (1990–1990/1991)
 Ma. Viktoria Gianna Bautista (born in August 1995) married to Jed Patricio
 Ma. Franzel Loudette Bautista (born in October 1997)
 Ramon Vicente "Ramboy/RV" Bautista (born December 1998)

Filmography

Television

Movies
 Yes Darling: Walang matigas na pulis 2 (1997) .... Gloria
 Separada (1994) .... Susan
 Walang matigas na pulis sa matinik na misis (1994) .... Gloria
 APO: Kingpin ng Maynila (1990)
 My Other Woman (1990)
  (1989) ....  Cecille
  (1988)
 Stupid Cupid (1988) .... Carmela
 Once Upon a Time (1987)
 Anak ng lupa (1987) .... Merriam
 The Graduates (1986)
  (1986) ... Cleo
 I Can't Stop Loving You (1985) .... Vina
  (1985)
  (1985)
  (1985)
 Mga kwento ni Lola Basyang (1985) ..... Black Fairy
 Super wan-tu-tri (1984)
 Bigats (1984)
  (1984)
 Daang hari (1984)
 Give Me Five! (1984)
 Boboy Tibayan (1983)
 Sa ngalan ng anak (1983)
 Indecent Exposure (1983)
 Sumuko ka na Ronquillo (1983)
 Summer Holiday (1983)
 Story of Three Loves (1982) .... Sarah
 Boystown (1981) .... Beauty Queen

References

External links

1968 births
Filipino television personalities
Filipino actor-politicians
People from Bacoor
Actresses from Cavite
Filipino child actresses
Living people
Members of the House of Representatives of the Philippines from Cavite
Lani
Filipino film actresses
Mayors of places in Cavite
Mayors of Bacoor
GMA Network personalities
ABS-CBN personalities